Bacchus Marsh College is a secondary school in the town of Bacchus Marsh, Victoria, Australia. It was opened in 1912 as Bacchus Marsh High School, and then later became Bacchus Marsh Secondary College. The college started with 38 students.

Darley campus
The second campus began construction on 30 August 1991 (according to the foundation stone within the campus). The college opened in December 1991, housing students in Years 7, 8 and 9.

The college is situated at the far end of Hallett's Way, at the bottom of Bald Hill. There are approximately 434 students at the Darley campus. Years 7 and 8 have set courses, whereas Year 9 gives students the opportunity to choose some of their own subjects. The Darley Campus merged with the Maddingley campus in 2009. Portable learning facilities are installed on the Maddingley campus to house years 7, 8 and 9. Darley campus closed at the end of 2008 and Bacchus Marsh College now operates at one site at Maddingley.

Maddingley campus
The Maddingley campus was opened in 1921. Until 1991, when the Darley campus was built, this was the only government High School in Bacchus Marsh.

The campus shares the use of the Bacchus Marsh Leisure Centre with the school, and was formerly managed by the YMCA.

Sport houses
The school has four houses, Manning (red), Main (green), Smith (blue) and Symington (yellow). They were established in 1951, and named after ex-students who were killed during World War II - Charles Manning, Kenneth Main, Campbell "Cam" Smith and brothers Henry "Ebb" and William "Bill" Symington.

References

External links
Official website
Department of Education and Training

Bacchus Marsh
Public high schools in Victoria (Australia)
Educational institutions established in 1921
1921 establishments in Australia